Gorenje Gradišče pri Šentjerneju is a settlement west of Šentjernej in southeastern Slovenia. The area is part of the traditional region of Lower Carniola. It is now included in the Southeast Slovenia Statistical Region.

Name
The name of the settlement was changed from Gorenje Gradišče to Gorenje Gradišče pri Šentjerneju in 1953. In the past the German name was Obergradische.

Church
The local church, built outside the settlement to the east, is dedicated to Saints Cosmas and Damian and belongs to the Parish of Šentjernej. It was first mentioned in written documents dating to 1526, but the current Baroque building dates to the early 17th century.

References

External links
Gorenje Gradišče pri Šentjerneju on Geopedia

Populated places in the Municipality of Šentjernej